Events in the year 1621 in Norway.

Incumbents
Monarch: Christian IV

Events
January–April – The first Vardø witch trials, eleven woman was executed by burning at the stake.

Arts and literature

Births

2 June – Jørgen Bjelke, military officer (died 1696).

Deaths

See also

References